Docker is a locational surname from Docker, Westmoreland, and Docker, Lancashire.

People with the surname "Docker":-

Adam Docker (born 1985), English-Pakistani association footballer
Adam Docker (born 1991), Australian rugby league player
Arthur Docker (1848–1929), Australian cricketer
Sir Bernard Docker (1896–1978), English industrialist
Lady Docker (1906–1983), English socialite and wife of Sir Bernard
Colin Docker (1925–2014), Anglican bishop
Douglas R. Docker (born 1967), French-American rock keyboard player
Dudley Docker (1862–1944), English businessman and cricketer
Ernest Brougham Docker (1842–1923), Australian judge
Ian Docker (born 1969), English association football player
Joseph Docker (1802–1884), Australian politician

 Kirk Docker, co-creator of Australian TV series ''You Can't Ask That
Ludford Docker (1860–1940), English businessman and cricketer

Mitchell Docker (born 1986), Australian cyclist
Ralph Docker (1855–1910), English cricketer
Robert Docker (1918–1992), English composer and arranger
Russell Docker (born 1967), British Paralympic skier

See also
Richard Döcker (1894–1968), German architect

References

English toponymic surnames